Messel is a municipality in the district of Darmstadt-Dieburg in Hesse near Frankfurt am Main in Germany.

The village is first mentioned, as Masilla, in the Lorsch codex.
Messel was the property of the lords of Groschlag from ca. 1400 to 1799. After the extinction of the Groschlag male lineage, the village would have passed to  the Archbishopric of Mainz but the population refused to accept this transition and paid homage to the daughters of the Groschlag family instead. The minister of the archbishopric, von Albini, consequently occupied the village with a force of 50 hussars. In 1806, the village fell to the Grand Duchy of Hesse.

The nearby Messel pit is an important site for Eocene fossils.

References

Darmstadt-Dieburg